Lowlife Princess: Noir is the debut studio album of South Korean singer Bibi. It was released on November 18, 2022, through Feel Ghood Music and 88rising. It consists of twelve tracks, preceded by five singles: "Animal Farm", "Motospeed 24", "Sweet Sorrow of Mother", "Bibi Vengeance", and "Jotto".

Theme 
The album "tells the story of the fictional Oh Geum-ji–inspired by the protagonist in Park Chan-wook’s Lady Vengeance" against the dystopian backdrop of the year 2044. Oh Geum-ji was abandoned as a child and wants to be loved even though she is a bad bitch. "As pollution and scarcity ravage Seoul and people fight for control of an underground society à la Sin City, she rises from the depths of despair to become the queen of this lawless land."

Music and lyrics 
Bibi tells a story that represents people with low social status. "The production mimics the record’s lyrical ferocity, offering an invigorating mix of sounds from dark pop ("Jotto"), futuristic EDM ("Blade"), pop-rock ("City Love"), Latin-inspired beats (“Bibi Vengeance”) and alternative R&B ("Animal Farm") to name a few."

Critical reception 

Yeom Dong-gyo of IZM rated the album 3 out of 5 stars. According to him, "Bibi, who has both skills and charisma, laid the groundwork with honest lyrics and sensuous sounds and solidified her identity with her new album. She appealed to Generation MZ by unraveling a story without hesitation while swinging back and forth between R&B and hip hop." 

Tanu Raj of NME rated the album 4 out of 5 stars. According to him, "Bibi claims her place as one of K-pop’s most engaging and evocative storytellers" on her first full-length album.

Kim Hyo-jin of Rhythmer also rated the album 4 out of 5 stars. According to her, "Bibi is definitely a solid storyteller" who "fleshes out a character and fascinates listeners at once with specific settings and appropriate word choices."

Year-end lists

Track listing

Charts

Weekly charts

Monthly charts

Sales

References 

2022 debut albums
88rising albums
Contemporary R&B albums by South Korean artists
Hip hop albums by South Korean artists
Korean-language albums